Isaiah Smithurst (6 November 1920 – 26 January 1982) was an English cricketer.  Smithurst was a left-handed batsman who bowled slow left-arm orthodox.  He was born in Eastwood, Nottinghamshire.

Smithurst made a single first-class appearance for Nottinghamshire against Gloucestershire in 1946 County Championship. During his only first-class match, he scored 1 run and was dismissed for a duck in Nottinghamshire's first innings, leaving him a batting average of 0.50.

He died at Giltbrook, Nottinghamshire on 26 January 1982.

References

External links
Isaiah Smithurst at Cricinfo
Isaiah Smithurst at CricketArchive

1920 births
1982 deaths
People from Eastwood, Nottinghamshire
English cricketers
Nottinghamshire cricketers
People from the Borough of Broxtowe
Cricketers from Nottinghamshire